San Francisco Parks Trust was a U.S. non-profit organization dedicated to the preservation and enhancement of parks in San Francisco, California.  In 2011 the San Francisco Parks Council and San Francisco Parks Trust merged to form the new San Francisco Parks Alliance.

History

Founded in 1971 with a $50,000 grant from developer and philanthropist, Walter Shorenstein, San Francisco Parks Trust, formerly Friends of Recreation & Parks, began as an all-volunteer organization dedicated to supporting San Francisco parks. SFPT's offices are located in historic McLaren Lodge at the eastern end of Golden Gate Park, overlooking the City Tree of San Francisco, a large Monterey Cypress.

Programs
SFPT partners with the San Francisco Departments of Parks and of Public Works, as well as community organizations, to facilitate the construction and maintenance of parks and community gardens. SFPT also sponsors guides giving tours of Golden Gate Park, as well as partnering with San Francisco Opera and San Francisco Chronicle Charities to present "Opera in the Park".

External links
San Francisco Parks Trust

References 

Organizations based in San Francisco